Jessica Aimee Sylvester (born 9 July 1987 in Newcastle-under-Lyme, Staffordshire) is a British freestyle swimmer.

Sylvester represented Great Britain at the 2008 Summer Olympics in the 4×100 m freestyle relay swimming event.

Jessica was raised in the small Village of Cheddleton and attended Westwood High School in Leek, before leaving to attend Nottingham University.

External links
British Olympic Association athlete profile
British Swimming athlete profile

English female swimmers
Olympic swimmers of Great Britain
Swimmers at the 2008 Summer Olympics
Living people
1987 births
Sportspeople from Newcastle-under-Lyme
European Aquatics Championships medalists in swimming
Commonwealth Games medallists in swimming
Commonwealth Games silver medallists for England
Swimmers at the 2010 Commonwealth Games
Medallists at the 2010 Commonwealth Games